A celebrity is a person who is famously recognized in a society or societies, be it in the physical or virtual world, such as social media; also, the state of being such a person.

Celebrity may also refer to:

Music
 Celebrity (album), a 2001 album by NSYNC
 "Celebrity" (Barenaked Ladies song), a 2004 UK-only single by the Canadian-based group Barenaked Ladies
 "Celebrity" (Brad Paisley song), a 2003 song by Brad Paisley on his album Mud on the Tires
 "C-lebrity", a song by Queen and Paul Rodgers
"Celebrity", a 2010 song by Lloyd Banks featuring Akon from the album H.F.M. 2 (The Hunger for More 2)
 "Celebrity" (IU song), a 2021 song by South Korean singer IU from her album Lilac

Publications
 The Celebrity, an 1897 novel by the American author Winston Churchill
 Celebrity, a promotional magazine published by the Church of Scientology

Film and television
 Celebrity (1928 film), an American silent comedy film
 Celebrity (1998 film), a film by Woody Allen
 Celebrity (TV programme), a 2000 British breakfast programme
 Celebrity (American TV series), a 1984 miniseries adaptation of a novel by Thomas Thompson
 Celeb (TV series), a British television comedy series starring Harry Enfield and Amanda Holden, based on a cartoon strip from Private Eye magazine
 Celebrity (South Korean TV series), a 2022 South Korean television series

Other uses
 Chevrolet Celebrity, a midsize car produced by Chevrolet (1982–1990)
 Fisher Celebrity, homebuilt aircraft
 Celebrity (game), a party game
 Celebrity Cruises, a cruise line
 Celebrity tomato, a tomato cultivar

See also